Benedict Semmes or Benedict J. Semmes may refer to:

Benedict Joseph Semmes (1789–1863), American politician
Benedict J. Semmes Jr. (1913–1994), American admiral